LCLS may refer to:

Lake County Library System, in Lake County, Florida, US
Library System of Lancaster County, in Lancaster, Pennsylvania, US
Linac Coherent Light Source, at the SLAC National Accelerator Laboratory in Menlo Park, California, US
Luzerne County Library System, in Luzerne County, Pennsylvania, US